Inermoleiopus is a genus of beetles in the family Cerambycidae, containing the following species:

 Inermoleiopus delkeskampi Breuning, 1958
 Inermoleiopus flavosignatus Breuning, 1972
 Inermoleiopus fuscosignatus Breuning, 1977
 Inermoleiopus girardi Breuning, 1978
 Inermoleiopus roseofasciatus Breuning, 1973

References

Acanthocinini
Taxa named by Stephan von Breuning (entomologist)